So Tough is the second studio album by British band Saint Etienne, released in 1993. It is their highest-charting album to date, reaching No. 7 on the UK Album Chart.

So Tough is the first Saint Etienne album to feature Sarah Cracknell as an official member of the band. It was originally intended as a concept album which starts at "Mario's Cafe" in London then travels around the world, but it ultimately came to be viewed as a solely London album.

Samples and references
One of the distinctive features of the album is the use of samples between the songs. The band were keen to use linking dialogue, similar to that used on some of their favourite albums – particularly The Who Sell Out by The Who and Head by The Monkees – as well as contemporary hip hop albums that featured recurring skits. They are taken from a variety of sources, including the films Peeping Tom, Billy Liar, The Picture of Dorian Gray, Lord of the Flies and That'll Be the Day, as well as the television series The Family and the 1958 stereo demonstration album A Journey into Stereophonic Sound. The band had intended to use a number of samples from American films, but the cost of clearing these samples led them to using primarily British samples. Additionally, the song "Conchita Martinez" features a recurring sample from the opening riff of Rush's 1980 hit "The Spirit of Radio". The string sounds used in the chorus of opening song "Mario's Café" are an interpolation of the piano melody from The Temptations' 1967 single "I Wish It Would Rain".

So Tough takes its title from the Beach Boys album Carl and the Passions – "So Tough". "Conchita Martinez" is named after the Grand Slam-winning Spanish tennis player Conchita Martínez, who later went on to win the Wimbledon singles title. The song "Mario's Cafe" was inspired by a real Kentish Town restaurant of that name.

Cover
The album cover features a picture of lead singer Sarah Cracknell aged 6, taken by her father Derek Cracknell.

Releases
The album was reissued as a limited edition 2-CD set with You Need a Mess of Help to Stand Alone.

The US release added "Join Our Club" (3:22), which had been a UK single in 1992. "Who Do You Think You Are" (3:49) is included on some US versions between "Here Come Clown Feet" and "Junk the Morgue". "You're in a Bad Way" (3:08) and "Hobart Paving" (4:57) are presented in their single versions, including extra instrumentation. The former is longer, while the latter features a drum pattern not present on the original version.

The album was reissued on 31 August 2009, as part of the ongoing Deluxe Editions of the band's recordings. The new release features B-sides, rare and unreleased tracks.

Track listing

1993 release

2009 reissue

Sample credits
 "Conchita Martinez" contains samples of "The Spirit of Radio" by Rush, sampled under licence from PolyGram Special.

Personnel
The liner notes list the album's personnel as follows:

 Bob Stanley – Prophet 5, Roland Jupiter, handclaps, "Spriguns of Tolgus"
 Pete Wiggs – Rogue Moog, Emax sampler, basso profundo, "polk salad"
 Sarah Cracknell – vocals, "Sri Lanka", "Macca keyring"
 Ian Catt – guitar, keyboard programming, "whistling jack"
 Q-Tee – vocals (on "Calico")
 Cajun Queen – bass guitar (on "Calico")
 Ranald MacDonald – "fluted face"
 Gerald M. Jaffe – voice of man in café ("food on my table"), management
 Simon Price – voice of man at bar
 Paul Kelly – photography (beach photo)
 Celina Nash – voice of waitress
 Jeff Barrett – labelhead and press

 Alan McGee – management
 Martin Kelly – management
 James Hy – photography
 Mdesign – sleeve design
 Michael Gillette – painting ("painter man")
 Andrew Wickham – "the kissing kind"
 Kate Askey – "fifth tattoo"
 Kevin Pearce – liner notes
 Saint Etienne – production
 Ian Catt – engineering (at RMS, London)

Charts

B-sides
from "Avenue"
 "Some Place Else"
 "Paper"
 "Johnny in the Echo Cafe"
 "Avenue (Variety club mix)" (Remixed by Gordon King and The "Natural" Pete Smith)
 "Avenue (Butlins mix)" (Remixed by Gordon King and The "Natural" Pete Smith)
 "Avenue (Martial mix)" (Remixed by Rudy Tambala/A.R. Kane)
 "Avenue (Venusian mix)" (Remixed by Rudy Tambala/A.R. Kane)

from "You're in a Bad Way"
 "Archway People"
 "California Snow Story"
 "Duke Duvet"
 "St. Etienne Speaks..."

from "Hobart Paving" / "Who Do You Think You Are"
 "Who Do You Think You Are"
 "Who Do You Think You Are (Quex-RD)" (Remixed by Aphex Twin)
 "Your Head My Voice (Voix Revirement)" (Remixed by Aphex Twin)
 "Who Do You Think You Are (Strobelights & Platform Shoes Mix) (Remixed by Roger Sanchez)
 "Who Do You Think You Are (Nu Solution Mix) (Remixed by Roger Sanchez)
 "Who Do You Think You Are (Saturday Night Fever Dub) (Remixed by Roger Sanchez)
 "Who Do You Think You Are (Radio Remix) (Remixed by Roger Sanchez)

References

External links
 Fan site with full lyrics and discussion of sample and influences of album

1993 albums
Saint Etienne (band) albums
Heavenly Recordings albums